Florentino José Fernández Román (born 9 November 1972 in Madrid), better known as Florentino Fernández or, simply, Flo, is a Spanish comedian, actor, TV host and showman.

He worked as a security guard before taking part in TV shows like Esta noche cruzamos el Mississippi or La sonrisa del pelícano with Pepe Navarro, where he impersonated Chiquito de la Calzada and created new characters based on this Spanish comedian such as Lucas Grijánder or Krispín Klander.

He went on working in TV programs like El informal as a conductor; 7 vidas, as an actor; or El club de la comedia, as a monologist.

He dubbed Mike Myers to Spanish in Austin Powers: The Spy Who Shagged Me and Austin Powers in Goldmember and he performed in the theatre show "5hombres.com" as a monologist.

As an actor, he made his first appearances in films like El oro de Moscú or Una de zombis, he made some cameos in films like Torrente 2 and Torrente 3 and he had a leading role with Santiago Segura, in Isi/Disi, Amor a lo Bestia.

He started to work with another comedian, Josema Yuste, in 2007 first in the play Una pareja de miedo and later in the sketch comedy series ¿Y ahora que?

On 13 May 2010 he became the conductor of the comedy program Tonterías las justas on Cuatro. The program ended on 1 July 2011 due to economical disagreements but it had a spiritual sequel from August 2011 to 2012 in Neox called Otra movida. In February 2013 he started another program of humor and news, Así nos va, in La Sexta.

Main works

Movies
2011
Kung Fu Panda 2 by Jennifer Yuh Nelson as Po (voice)
2010
Despicable Me by Pierre Coffin and Chris Renaud as Gru & Gru's mom (voices)
2008
Kung Fu Panda by Mark Osborne as Po (voice)
2007
Noah's Ark as Noah and Xiro (voices)
2006
Isi/Disi, Alto Voltaje by Miguel Ángel Lamata as Disi
2005
Robots by Chris Wedge and Carlos Saldanha as Manivela (voice).
Torrente 3 by Santiago Segura as Hombre del lavabo.
Valiant by Gary Chapman as Bugsy (voice).
2004
Isi/Disi by Chema de la Peña as Disi.
2003
Una de zombis by Miguel Ángel Lamata as Zombi Incompetente.
El oro de Moscú by Jesús Bonilla.

Teatre
5hombres.com 2003

TV

Actor
7 vidas - Telecinco as Félix Gimeno Huete
La Sonrisa del Pelícano 1997 - Antena 3 as Lucas Grijander y Krispín Klander
Esta noche cruzamos el Mississippi 1995 -  Telecinco idem
Espejo secreto 1997 - TVE

Host
Killer Karaoke (2014) Cuatro
Así nos va (2013) laSexta
Otra movida (2011 - 2012) Neox
Tonterías las justas (2010 - 2011) Cuatro
El club de Flo (2006 - 2007) La Sexta
Planeta finito (2006) La Sexta
Splunge (2005) TVE
UHF (2003) Antena 3
El Show de Flo  (2002 - 2003) TVE
El Club de la Comedia  (1999) Canal Plus
El Informal (1998 - 2002) Telecinco

Awards and nominations

References

External links
Website 

1972 births
Living people
People from the Province of Guadalajara
Spanish male film actors
Spanish comedians
Spanish television presenters
Male actors from Castilla–La Mancha
Spanish male television actors
Spanish stand-up comedians